The Polesie State Radioecological Reserve (Acronym PSRER)  is a radioecological nature reserve in the Polesie region of Belarus, which was created to enclose the territory of Belarus most affected by radioactive fallout from the Chernobyl disaster. The reserve adjoins the Chernobyl Exclusion Zone in Ukraine. The environmental monitoring and countermeasure agency, Bellesrad, oversees the food cultivation and forestry in the area.

History

Two years after the Chernobyl disaster, the Belarusian part of the Chernobyl Exclusion Zone was extended to a more highly contaminated area. The reserve was established on July 18, 1988. Before the disaster, over 22,000 people lived there in 96 settlements. The population was evacuated after the disaster.

Geography

Overview
The area, located in southern Gomel Region and bordering the Ukrainian Exclusion Zone, includes part of the raions (districts) of Brahin, Chojniki and Naroulia. The southern strip is crossed by the Chernihiv–Ovruch railway, which passes through the villages of Kaporanka, Kalyban and Pasudava.

Settlements
The following list shows the abandoned villages included in the reserve. Population refers to the 1959 census. "fam." refers to the number of families evacuated after the 1986 disaster.

Fauna and flora

The reserve hosts many rare and endangered species, which thrive there thanks to the virtual absence of humans. They include European bison, Przewalski horse, Moose, Brown bear, Golden eagle, and White-tailed eagle. It is home to the world's largest population of the European pond turtle. According to PSRER administration, there are 7 reptile, 11 amphibian, 46 mammal, 213 bird and 25 fish species. Of those, 70 are listed in the International Red Book and the Red Book of the Republic of Belarus. Flora includes 1251 registered plants, which is more than two-thirds of the flora of the country, and 18 of the plant species are listed in the Red Book. It was found that voles have higher rates of cataracts, useful populations of bacteria on the wings of birds in the zone are lower, partial albinism is common among barn swallows, cuckoos have become less common. Serious animal mutations, though, happened only right after the accident.

Reserve employees
The State Reserve employs 700 people, 40 of whom are academic degree holders.

Activities 
Although the reserve was established for the purpose of radiobiological and environmental research, it is of interest to other biologists. Due to the minimal human presence, it is possible to observe the natural development of wildlife in the conditions of Belarus. "In connection with the removal of anthropogenic load and the wealth of flora the ideal conditions for the recovery of the animal world have been created here", states the report of the Committee on the Health Effects of the Chernobyl disaster at the Council of Ministers of Belarus. Some new species, including European bison, have been introduced on the territory of the reserve.

Main activities
Administration of PSRER is located in the town of Chojniki. The annual budget of PSRER is 4 million USD. Main activities include:
 Measures to prevent radioactive material from spreading beyond the reserve's borders,
 Wildfire prevention.
 Radiation monitoring.
 Research of nuclear decontamination of soil.
 Preventing unauthorized persons from entering the reserve.
 Planting trees to prevent air and water erosion, which could spread contaminated material.

Extra-budgetary activities
The administration uses land in the reserve to earn income in addition to its budget. The purpose is to increase the self-sufficiency of the reserve, save money, increase the salaries of employees and contribute positively to the GDP of Belarus. Activities include: 
 Forestry and woodworking, including the sale of timber, firewood, and individual carpentry orders
 Growing crops as fodder for animals or for human consumption 
 Purebred horse breeding using forage resources in the reserve
 Pig farming, cattle farming, dairy farming
 Beekeeping, honey production
 Production of fruit tree seedlings
 Providing services to citizens and organizations (transport, sanitation, human decontamination, research on the concentration of radionuclides).

As of 2004, the herd at the reserve's horse farm numbered 230 horses. Cattle are being bred to endure the conditions of radioactive contamination, and young individuals are sold for further breeding.

During all activities, radionuclide concentrations are monitored to ensure they do not exceed certain limits.

Neighboring nature reserves
Mizhrichynskyi Regional Landscape Park
Zahalʹnozoolohichnyy Zakaznyk (Загальнозоологічний заказник, General Zoological Reserve)
Zalissia National Nature Park

Proposed for nature reserves
Dnieper-Teterivske State Forestry

See also
Protected areas of Belarus

References

External links

 Polesie State Radiation and Ecological Reserve (official website)
  (map showing borders)
 Полесский государственный радиационно-экологический заповедник
 Charnobyl 30 Years Later – Belarus Photo Digest 
 Chernobyl: Fact And Legacy

 
Biosphere reserves of Belarus
Geography of Gomel Region
Aftermath of the Chernobyl disaster
Radioactively contaminated areas